Election day is the day on which political elections are held.

By country:

Election Day (United Kingdom), the day on which political elections are held in the United Kingdom
Election Day (United States), the day set by law for the general elections of public officials in the United States
 Historical Russian election days
Russian Election Day, 2014
Russian Election Day, 2017

Media

Film
 Election Day (1929 film), Our Gang short film
 Election Day (2007 film), Russian film

Television
 "Election Day Part I", episode 148 of The West Wing (TV series)
 "Election Day Part II", episode 149 of The West Wing (TV series)
 "Election Day" (Modern Family), the nineteenth episode of the third season of the American sitcom Modern Family

Literature
 "Election Day (short story)", a 2019 alternate history short story by Harry Turtledove

Music
 "Election Day", a 1985 single by Arcadia
"Election Day", a 1987 song by The Replacements, released as a B-side to the single "Alex Chilton"